Mabie may refer to:

Mabie, Dumfries and Galloway, Scotland, a collection of mountain biking routes
Mabie, California, United States, a census-designated place
Mabie, West Virginia, United States, an unincorporated community
Mabie (surname)